The southern giraffe (Giraffa giraffa), also known as two-horned giraffe, is a species of giraffe native to Southern Africa.  However, the IUCN currently recognizes only one species of giraffe with nine subspecies.

Southern giraffes have rounded or blotched spots, some with star-like extensions on a light tan background, running down to the hooves. They range from South Africa, Angola, Namibia, Botswana, Zambia, Zimbabwe, Mozambique. Their approximate population is composed of 44,500 individuals.

Giraffes as one species are considered Vulnerable to extinction by the IUCN.

Taxonomy and evolution

Living giraffes were originally classified as one species by Carl Linnaeus in 1758, under the binomial name Cervus camelopardalis. Morten Thrane Brünnich classified the genus Giraffa in 1772. Once considered a subspecies of the conglomerate Giraffa camelopardalis species, recent studies proposed the southern giraffe as a separate species of a reorganised genus Giraffa, under the binomial name Giraffa giraffa. However, the taxonomic scheme has been criticized, and currently the IUCN recognizes only one species of giraffe with nine subspecies.

Subspecies
Two subspecies of southern giraffe are proposed.

Descriptions
The Cape subspecies of the southern giraffe has dark, somewhat rounded patches "with some fine projections" on a tawny background colour. The spots extend down the legs and get smaller. The median lump of bulls is less developed.

Distribution and habitat
The southern giraffes live in the savannahs and woodlands of northern South Africa, Angola, southern Botswana, southern Zimbabwe, Zambia and south-western Mozambique. After local extinctions in various places, the South African giraffes have been reintroduced in many parts of Southern Africa, including in Eswatini. They are common in both inside and outside of protected areas.

Ecology and behavior
Southern giraffes usually live in savannahs and woodlands where food plants are available. Southern giraffes are herbivorous mammals. They feed on leaves, flowers, fruits and shoots of woody plants such as Acacia.

Threats
Southern giraffes are not  threatened, as their population is increasing.

References

External links

southern giraffe
Mammals of Southern Africa
Extant Miocene first appearances
southern giraffe
Taxa named by Mathurin Jacques Brisson
Taxobox binomials not recognized by IUCN